James Warnock (1912 in Lurgan – 1987) was a Southpaw boxer from the Shankill Road, Belfast, Ireland.

Jimmy Warnock began his early boxing career at Belfast's Chapel Fields in prize fights organised by Clara Copley. In the 1930s he beat undisputed world flyweight champion Benny Lynch on points twice - on 2 March 1936 at the King's Hall, Belfast and again on 2 June 1937 in front of 16,000 people in torrential rain at Parkhead stadium in Glasgow.

He was one of three boxing brothers, including Billy Warnock.

References

External links
Belfast Telegraph, Down Memory Lane 
 The Fighting Life of the Warnocks (1936) Article. 
List of pre-war boxers in UK
Belfast Cathedral Artists & Sculptors page - reference to Warnock's bust by Morris Harding
 article about John Thomas Whalley who fought Jimmy Warnock
Article about the night the lights went out in the King's Hall, Belfast

Further reading
 Benny: The Life and Times of a Fighting Legend - by John Burrowes 

1912 births
1987 deaths
Boxers from Belfast
Flyweight boxers
Male boxers from Northern Ireland